Charles Irwin Stengle (December 5, 1869 – November 23, 1953) was an American newspaperman and politician who served one term as a U.S. Representative from New York, serving one term from 1923 to 1925.

Biography 
Born in Savageville, Virginia, Stengle attended the public schools. In 1890, he graduated from Goldey College (now Goldey–Beacom College) in Wilmington, Delaware.

Stengle served as the chaplain of the Delaware House of Representatives in 1898.  He then moved to Virginia, working in the newspaper business in Norfolk and Fredericksburgh.  He moved to New York City in 1910 where he continued his career in journalism until 1917. Secretary of the municipal civil service commission of New York City from January 1, 1918, to January 1, 1923, when he resigned.

Congress 
Stengle was elected as a Democrat to the Sixty-eighth Congress (March 4, 1923 – March 3, 1925).
He was not a candidate for renomination in 1924 to the Sixty-ninth Congress.

Later career and death 
He was appointed by President Coolidge in 1925 as a lieutenant colonel, Specialist Reserves, attached to The Adjutant General's Office.

He was editor of the National Farm News. Legislative representative of the American Federation of Government Employees from 1934 until his retirement in August 1953. He died in Shaftos Corner, New Shrewsbury, New Jersey, on  November 23, 1953. He was interred at Monmouth Memorial Park in Tinton Falls, New Jersey.

Sources

External links

 

1869 births
1953 deaths
Goldey–Beacom College alumni
Politicians from Fredericksburg, Virginia
Democratic Party members of the United States House of Representatives from New York (state)